The 1959 World Table Tennis Championships men's singles was the 25th edition of the men's singles championship. 

Jung Kuo-tuan defeated Ferenc Sidó in the final, winning three sets to one to secure the title.

Results

+ Time limit rule applies

See also
List of World Table Tennis Championships medalists

References

-